Route 129 is a highway in northern and central Missouri. Its northern terminus is at the Iowa state line where it continues as Appanoose County Road T20; its southern terminus is at Route 3 in Roanoke.

Major intersections

References

129
Transportation in Howard County, Missouri
Transportation in Chariton County, Missouri
Transportation in Macon County, Missouri
Transportation in Linn County, Missouri
Transportation in Sullivan County, Missouri
Transportation in Putnam County, Missouri